Hannibal Lime Company Office is a historic commercial building located at Hannibal, Marion County, Missouri.  It was built about 1880, and is a two-story red brick structure, three bays wide and six deep.  It has a rubble foundation, tall segmental arched openings, and hipped roof with front gable.

It was added to the National Register of Historic Places in 1984.

References

Commercial buildings on the National Register of Historic Places in Missouri
Commercial buildings completed in 1880
Buildings and structures in Hannibal, Missouri
National Register of Historic Places in Marion County, Missouri